Josias Saraiva Monteiro Teófilo (born in Recife on August 27, 1987) is a Brazilian writer, photographer, journalist and film director.

Works 
He directed the film The Garden of Afflictions (2017), which is about some philosophical themes from the work of Brazilian Olavo de Carvalho.

He worked for the Continente magazine as a journalist. There, he interviewed personalities such as Hélène Grimaud, Boris Schnaiderman, Phillipe Jarrousky and Paulo Mendes da Rocha.

In 2021 he finished the documentary Nem Tudo Se Desfaz, about the impeachment of Dilma Rousseff and the election of Conservative president Jair Bolsonaro.

References 

Living people
1987 births
Brazilian cinematographers
Brazilian journalists
Brazilian film directors
People from Recife